Apocalypse Now Redux is a 2001 American extended version of Francis Ford Coppola's epic 1979 war film Apocalypse Now. Coppola, along with editor/longtime collaborator Walter Murch, added 49 minutes of material that had been removed from the initial theatrical release. It is a significant re-edit of the original version.

Production
Francis Ford Coppola began production on the new cut with working-partner Kim Aubry. Coppola then tried to get Murch, who was reluctant at first. He thought it would be extremely difficult recutting a film that had taken two years to edit originally. He later changed his mind (after working on the reconstruction of Orson Welles' Touch of Evil). Coppola and Murch then examined several of the rough prints and dailies for the film. It was decided early on that the editing of the film would be like editing a new film altogether. One such example was the new French plantation sequence. The scenes were greatly edited to fit into the movie originally, only to be cut out in the end. When working again on the film, instead of using the heavily edited version, Murch decided to work the scene all over again, editing it as if for the first time.

Much work needed to be done to the new scenes. Due to the off-screen noises during the shoot, most of the dialogue was impossible to hear. During post-production of the film the actors were brought back to re-record their lines (known as A.D.R. or dubbing). This was done for the scenes that made it into the original cut, but not for the deleted scenes. For the Redux version, Martin Sheen, Robert Duvall, Sam Bottoms, Albert Hall, Frederic Forrest, and Aurore Clément were brought back to record ADR for the new scenes.

Music
New music was recreated and recorded for the remade film by San Francisco Bay Area-based composer Ed Goldfarb, specifically the added tracks "Clean's Funeral" and "Love Theme". For example, it was thought no music had been composed for Willard and Roxanne's romantic interlude in the French Plantation scene. To make matters worse, composer Carmine Coppola had died in 1991. However, the old recording and musical scores were checked and a track titled "Love Theme" was found. During scoring, Francis Coppola had told Carmine, his father, to write a theme for the scene before it was ultimately deleted. For the remake, the track was recorded by a group of synthesists.

Cinematography
Vittorio Storaro also returned from Italy to head the development of a new color balance of the film and new scenes. When Redux was being released, Storaro learned that a Technicolor dye-transfer process was being brought back. The dye-transfer is a three-strip process that makes the color highly saturated and has consistent black tone. Storaro wished to use this on Redux, but in order to do it, he needed to cut the original negative of Apocalypse Now, leaving Apocalypse Now Redux the only version available. Storaro decided to do it, when convinced by Coppola that this version would be the one that would be remembered.

New scenes and alterations
The film contains several alterations, and two entirely new scenes. One of the new scenes has the boat meeting the Playmates once again, farther up the river; the other has them meet a family of holdout French colonists on their remote rubber plantation. There are also a few additional scenes with Colonel Kurtz.

Cast

 Christian Marquand as Hubert de Marais
 Aurore Clément as Roxanne Sarrault
 Roman Coppola as Francis de Marais
 Gian-Carlo Coppola as Gilles de Marais
 Michel Pitton as Philippe de Marais
 Franck Villard as Gaston de Marais
 David Olivier as Christian de Marais
 Chrystel Le Pelletier as Claudine
 Robert Julian as The Tutor
 Yvon Le Saux as Sgt. Le Fevre
 Henri Sadardiel as French soldier #1
 Gilbert Renkens as French soldier #2

Reception
Apocalypse Now Redux originally premiered at the 2001 Cannes Film Festival. The screening marked the anniversary of the original Apocalypse Now screening as a work in progress, where it won the Palme d'Or. Coppola went to the festival, accompanied by Murch, Storaro, production designer Dean Tavoularis, producer Kim Aubry and actors Bottoms and Clément.

Box office

Critical response
On review aggregator Rotten Tomatoes, the film holds a "Certified Fresh" 93% rating based on 84 reviews, with an average rating of 7.80/10. The website's critics consensus reads, "The additional footage slows down the movie somewhat (some say the new cut is inferior to the original), but Apocalypse Now Redux is still a great piece of cinema." Metacritic, which uses a weighted average, assigned the film a score of 92 out of 100 based on 39 critics, indicating "universal acclaim". Some critics thought highly of the additions, such as A. O. Scott of The New York Times, who wrote that it "grows richer and stranger with each viewing, and the restoration of scenes left in the cutting room two decades ago has only added to its sublimity."

Some critics, however, thought the new scenes slowed the pacing and were too lengthy (notably the French plantation sequence) and added nothing overall to the film's impact. Owen Gleiberman wrote "Apocalypse Now Redux is the meandering, indulgent art project that [Francis Ford Coppola] was still enough of a craftsman, in 1979, to avoid." Despite this, other critics still gave it high ratings. Roger Ebert wrote: "Longer or shorter, redux or not, Apocalypse Now is one of the central events of my life as a filmgoer." Anthony Lane wrote, "if you have never watched Apocalypse Now in any form; if you know it well and wish to bend your Jesuitical attention to the latest addenda; if you ave grown to love it on scrumbled videotape but failed to catch it on the big screen;if you were out of your head during a pre-dawn college screening, duly noted the movie as a trip, and find yourself unable to remember whether the trip in question was Coppola's, America's, or yours; in short, however relevant or rocky your relations with this film—see it now."

Accolades

Soundtrack
A soundtrack was released on July 31, 2001 by Nonesuch. The soundtrack contains most of the original tracks (remastered), as well as some for the new scenes ("Clean's Funeral", "Love Theme"). The score was composed by Carmine and Francis Ford Coppola (with some tracks co-composed by Mickey Hart and Richard Hansen). The first track is an abridged version of The Doors' "The End". All songs written by Carmine Coppola and Francis Ford Coppola, except where noted:

 "The End" – The Doors
 "The Delta"
 "Dossier"
 "Orange Light"
 "Ride of the Valkyries" – Richard Wagner
 "Suzie Q" (Dale Hawkins) – Flash Cadillac
 "Nung River", Mickey Hart
 "Do Lung", Richard Hansen
 "Letters From Home"
 "Clean's Death", Mickey Hart
 "Clean's Funeral"
 "Love Theme"
 "Chief's Death"
 "Voyage"
 "Chef's Head"
 "Kurtz' Chorale"
 "Finale"

References

External links
 
 
 
 

Apocalypse Now
2001 films
2000s adventure drama films
2000s war drama films
Alternative versions of films
American adventure drama films
American epic films
American war drama films
American Zoetrope films
Anti-war films about the Vietnam War
Films about assassinations
Films based on works by Joseph Conrad
Films directed by Francis Ford Coppola
Films produced by Francis Ford Coppola
Films set in 1969
Films set in Cambodia
Films shot in the Philippines
2000s French-language films
Khmer-language films
Miramax films
Films with screenplays by Francis Ford Coppola
Films with screenplays by John Milius
Films about United States Army Special Forces
Films about the United States Navy
Vietnam War films
Vietnamese-language films
War adventure films
War epic films
2001 drama films
Works based on Heart of Darkness
2000s English-language films
2000s American films